Debel may refer to:

 Debel, Lebanon
 Debel, Oromo Name, Oromo, Ethiopia, African name for a boy meaning 'in addition to,  gift of ' 
 Debel, Ethiopia, a town in the Afar Region
 DEBEL, the Defence Bioengineering and Electromedical Laboratory, an Indian national defense laboratory under DRDO, located in Bangalore.
 Debel Gallery
 Etienne Debel (1931-1993), Flemish-born actor and director

See also
Debelle, surname
DeBell, surname